is a 1993 Japan-exclusive Super Famicom Formula One racing video game licensed by FOCA to Fuji Television, which is based on the 1993 Formula One season.

The game was supervised by Aguri Suzuki and can be considered as the sequel to Aguri Suzuki F-1 Super Driving. It features a DSP-1 chip. In single-player mode, there is a split screen and the player is given five views to choose from (top view, side view, turn view, camera view and back view), while controlling the car in the typical chase view.

Reception
On release, Famicom Tsūshin scored the game a 24 out of 40.

References

1993 video games
Formula One video games
Genki (company) games
LOZC G. Amusements games
Japan-exclusive video games
Super Nintendo Entertainment System games
Super Nintendo Entertainment System-only games
Video games developed in Japan
Video games set in 1993
Multiplayer and single-player video games